Luisa Garella is an Italian former film actress who appeared in a number of films during the Fascist era. Her birth year has been given as both 1913 and 1921.

Selected filmography
 The Matchmaker (1934)
 The Man Who Smiles (1936)
 Joe the Red (1936)
 The Former Mattia Pascal (1937)
 Scampolo (1941)
 The Last Dance (1941)
 Grattacieli (1943)
 Short Circuit (1943)

References

Bibliography
 Goble, Alan. The Complete Index to Literary Sources in Film. Walter de Gruyter, 1999.

External links

20th-century births
Year of death unknown
Italian film actresses
Actors from Florence